The 2015 European Champions Cup was a European baseball competition, held from June 2, to August 9, 2015. This was the fifty-third iteration of the Cup since its inaugural tournament in 1963. The champions were Dutch team Curaçao Neptunus, winning their eighth title.

List of competing teams

First round

Paris Group 

|}

Unipolsai Bologna and T&A San Marino advance to playoff with best HTH.

Playoff

Rotterdam Group 

Draci Brno advances to playoff with better HTH.

|}

Playoff

Championship 

Game 1

Game 2

Game 3

Statistics leaders

Batting

Pitching

See also
 European Baseball Championship
 Asia Series
 Caribbean Series
 Baseball awards#Europe

References

European Cup (baseball)
International baseball competitions in Europe
2015 in baseball